Joshua Brooks may refer to:

 Joshua William Brooks (1790–1882), English religious leader
 J. Twing Brooks (1884–1956), American politician

See also
Joshua Brookes (disambiguation)